Xenophrys longipes is a species of frog in the family Megophryidae. It is also known as the Malacca spadefoot toad, red legged spine-eyed frog, red-legged horn frog, and slender-legged horned frog. It is found in the Malay Peninsula (Peninsular Malaysia and southern Thailand and Burma). Records from Cambodia and Vietnam are considered doubtful.

Description
The body is relatively slender, as are the long hind legs. The tympanum is distinct. The dorsal skin is smooth but there are small warts on the flanks. The supratympanic fold is distinct and there are two pairs of delicate, oblique folds that converge posteriorly on the scapular region. The ventral surface is smooth. The dorsum is olive brown. There are oblique vertical dark bars on the sides of the head and a large triangular dark marking between the eyes. The limbs have dark cross-bars. The ventrum is pale reddish brown marbled and spotted with dark brown.

Habitat and conservation
This species inhabits evergreen rainforests and montane moss forests. During the day they hide under rocks and logs, etc. The tadpoles live in streams.

Xenophrys longipes are uncommon even in prime habitat. They can be locally threatened by habitat loss (forest clearance).

References

External links
Amphibian and Reptiles of Peninsular Malaysia - Xenophrys longipes

Xenophrys
Amphibians of Malaysia
Amphibians of Myanmar
Amphibians of Thailand
Amphibians described in 1886
Taxa named by George Albert Boulenger
Taxonomy articles created by Polbot